The Chée is a  long river in the Meuse and Marne départements, northeastern France. Its source is in the Barrois, near Marat-la-Grande, a hamlet in Les Hauts-de-Chée. It flows generally southwest. It is a right tributary of the Saulx into which it flows at Vitry-en-Perthois, near Vitry-le-François.

Its main tributary is the Vière.

Départements and communes along its course
This list is ordered from source to mouth: 
 Meuse: Les Hauts-de-Chée, Rembercourt-Sommaisne, Louppy-le-Château, Villotte-devant-Louppy, Laheycourt, Noyers-Auzécourt, Nettancourt, Brabant-le-Roi, Revigny-sur-Ornain 
 Marne: Vroil, Bettancourt-la-Longue, Alliancelles, Heiltz-le-Maurupt, Jussecourt-Minecourt, Heiltz-l'Évêque, Outrepont, Changy, Merlaut, Vitry-en-Perthois

References

Rivers of France
Rivers of Marne (department)
Rivers of Meuse (department)
Rivers of Grand Est